Elizabeth Burnley CBE (born 14 March 1959), née Elizabeth Harrison, was the Chief Guide of Girlguiding UK between 2006 and 2011.

Early life
At the University of Nottingham, she completed a BSc in Psychology, then an MSc in Occupational Psychology.

Girlguiding UK
Burnley first got involved with Guiding as a Brownie and she was also a Guide. She has previously held the post of International Commissioner within Girlguiding UK.

In a webchat in September 2006, she said her most memorable experience as a Guide was "an "incident hike" - our team got lost on a moor, capsized our raft and missed the casualty we were meant to rescue - but amazing fun!"

Burnley was appointed Commander of the Order of the British Empire (CBE) in the 2010 Birthday Honours.

Personal life
Professionally, she has worked in Human Resources for British Rail Engineering Limited and Boots UK. She now is a programme director for Common Purpose UK since 2007. Now widowed, Burnley was formerly married to Roger Burnley in 2000.

See also

 Girl Guiding and Girl Scouting
 Girl Guides
 Bear Grylls

References

External links
 Chief Guide's Welcome

Girlguiding officials
Living people
1959 births
Alumni of the University of Nottingham
Commanders of the Order of the British Empire
Chief Guides